Jack Basil Armstrong (21 April 1899 – 21 January 1942) was an Australian rules footballer who played with St Kilda in the Victorian Football League (VFL).

Prior to his football career Armstrong had enlisted on his eighteenth birthday to serve in World War I, serving in England and France.

Notes

External links 

1899 births
1942 deaths
Australian rules footballers from Victoria (Australia)
St Kilda Football Club players
Kyneton Football Club players
Australian military personnel of World War I